Fiona is a hippopotamus born at the Cincinnati Zoo and Botanical Garden in Cincinnati, Ohio, United States, on January 24, 2017. The first Nile hippo imaged on ultrasound pre-natally, and the first born at the zoo in 75 years, she was born prematurely and cared for with the assistance of the Cincinnati Children's Hospital.

Life
Fiona's parents are Henry and Bibi. She is the first Nile hippo to be born at the Cincinnati Zoo in 75 years, and the first of the species to be scanned in the womb using ultrasound. She was unable to stand and required bottle feeding with milk from her mother, supplemented with infant formula. This was the first time a hippopotamus had been milked and the milk analyzed. The following month, while teething, she began refusing her bottle and became dehydrated; a catheter for the delivery of intravenous fluids was inserted with the assistance of members of the vascular access team at Cincinnati Children's Hospital. The preemie team had previously sent the zoo a care package for her.

Zoo staff named the baby hippo Fiona because her ears resemble those of the Shrek character.

An 18 year old male Hippo named Tucker was moved from the San Francisco zoo to the Cincinnati zoo as  part of the Association of Zoos and Aquariums' Hippo Species Survival Plan. The move has Tucker being slowly introduced to the Fiona/Bibi duo with hopes that Tucker would be a suitable mate for Bibi. On August 3, 2022 Fiona's half-brother Fritz, the son of Tucker and Bibi, was born at the Cincinnati Zoo.

Popularity
The Fiona Show was launched on Facebook in August 2017. Saving Fiona, a children's book about her written by the zoo's director, Thane Maynard, was published in June 2018. A video posted on social media by the zoo went viral, as did a couple's photographs of Fiona watching them get engaged in October 2017. In August 2018 a mural of Fiona was unveiled in downtown Cincinnati; Lucie Rice won the contest to design it.

Fiona appeared in Cincinnati Ballet's December 2018 production of Nutcracker, played by a  dancer, and "stole the show".

Fiona has been used to predict the result of the Super Bowl each year since her birth, by choosing between enrichment items with the two teams' emblems. She chose the winning team in 2018, chose wrong in 2019, and in 2020 vomited on the item representing the Kansas City Chiefs, who would win that year.

Illustrator Richard Cowdrey has written two books about Fiona, including a Christmas book, A Very Fiona Christmas.

Notes

References

External links
 Hippo Baby Fiona Updates, Cincinnati Zoo

2017 animal births
Individual animals in the United States
Individual hippopotamuses